Christopher Allen may refer to:
Christopher Allen (cricketer) (1944–2012), English cricketer
Christopher Allen (critic) (born 1953), Australian art critic
Christopher Allen (American football), American football linebacker
Chris Cross (born 1952), real name Christopher Allen, musician with Ultravox
Christopher Cordley Allen, guitarist with Neon Trees

See also
James Christopher Allen, American guitarist
Chris Allen (disambiguation)
Christopher Allen Bouchillon (1893–1968), American country music and blues musician